William Edward Trevithick (1899 Kells, County Meath - 1958) was an Irish botanical illustrator who contributed some 60 botanical plates to Curtis’s Botanical Magazine.

Trevithick was born while his father was head gardener to Lord Headfort in his great estate near Kells. His son, also William Edward, was a gardener at Headfort House from the age of 13, then at Glasnevin, and finally at Kew, where he worked in the herbarium.

Trevithick produced illustrations for Flora of West Tropical Africa and Flora Malesiana.

He served in World War I, later worked as a commercial artist after starting his own advertising company in the 1930s. His artwork was for Rolls-Royce and C.C. Wakefield and Co Ltd., the latter producing Castrol motor oil. His work featured on the covers of Flight Magazine and Aeroplane. Being an enthusiastic aviator, he qualified as a pilot and became a member of the Royal Aero Club.

References

External links
Illustrations by William Edward Trevithick

Botanical illustrators
1899 births
1958 deaths